The close back rounded vowel, or high back rounded vowel, is a type of vowel sound used in many spoken languages.

In most languages, this rounded vowel is pronounced with protruded lips ('endolabial'). However, in a few cases the lips are compressed ('exolabial').

Close back protruded vowel
The close back protruded vowel is the most common variant of the close back rounded vowel. As there is no dedicated IPA diacritic for protrusion, the symbol for the close back rounded vowel with an old diacritic for labialization, can be used as an  symbol .

Features

Occurrence
{| class="wikitable" style="clear: both;"
! colspan="2" | Language !! Word !! IPA !! Meaning !! Notes
|-
| Afrikaans || Standard ||  ||  || 'book' || Only weakly rounded. See Afrikaans phonology
|-
| Arabic || Standard || /ǧanuub || || 'south' || See Arabic phonology
|-
| Armenian || Eastern || /dur || || 'door' || 
|-
| Bavarian || Amstetten dialect || und ||  || 'and' || Contrasts close , near-close , close-mid  and open-mid  back rounded vowels in addition to the open central unrounded .
|-
| colspan="2" | Bulgarian || /lud || || 'crazy' || See Bulgarian phonology
|-
| colspan="2" | Catalan ||  ||  || 'juice' || See Catalan phonology
|-
| rowspan="3" | Chinese || Mandarin ||  /  || || 'earth' || See Standard Chinese phonology
|-
| Cantonese ||  /  ||  || 'man' || See Cantonese phonology
|-
| Shanghainese || /ku || || 'melon' || Height varies between close and close-mid; contrasts with a close to close-mid back compressed vowel.
|-
| colspan="2" |Chuvash
|урам
|[ur'am]
|'street'
|
|-
| Danish || Standard ||  ||  || 'you' || See Danish phonology
|-
| Dutch || Standard ||  ||  || 'foot' || Somewhat fronted in Belgian Standard Dutch.
|-
See Australian English phonology
|-
See South African English phonology
|-
| Cultivated South African || rowspan="8" | boot || rowspan="6" |  || rowspan="8" | 'boot' || rowspan="8" | Typically more front than cardinal . Instead of being back, it may be central  in Geordie and RP, and front  in Multicultural London. See English phonology and South African English phonology
|-
| General American
|-
| Geordie
|-
| Multicultural London
|-
| Received Pronunciation
|-
| Welsh
|-
| Pakistani || 
|-
|Greater New York City || 
|-
| New Zealand || treacle ||  || 'treacle' || Possible realization of the unstressed vowel , which is variable in rounding and ranges from central to (more often) back and close to close-mid. See New Zealand English phonology
|-
| colspan="2" | Estonian ||  ||  || 'feather' (gen. sg.) || See Estonian phonology
|-
| colspan="2" | Finnish ||  || || 'flower'|| See Finnish phonology
|-
| colspan="2" | Faroese ||  ||  || 'yellow' || See Faroese phonology
|-
| colspan="2" | French ||  ||  || 'where' || See French phonology
|-
| colspan="2" | Georgian || /guda ||||'leather bag'||
|-
| rowspan="2" | German || Standard ||  ||  || 'foot' || See Standard German phonology
|-
See Standard German phonology
|-
| Greek || Modern Standard ||  / pou ||  || 'where' || See Modern Greek phonology
|-
| colspan="2" | Hungarian ||  ||  || 'way' || See Hungarian phonology
|-
| colspan=2 | Icelandic|| || || 'you' || See Icelandic phonology
|-
|Indonesian
|Standard Indonesian
|unta
|[unta]
|'camel'
|See Indonesian phonology
|-
| colspan="2" | Italian || |||| 'all', 'everything' || See Italian phonology
|-
| colspan="2" | Kaingang ||  || 'in the belly' ||
|-
| colspan="2" | Kazakh || туған/tuğan ||  || 'native' || Transcribed phonemically as 
|-
| colspan="2" | Khmer ||  /  ||  || 'village' || See Khmer phonology
|-
| colspan="2" | Korean ||  / {{lang|ko-Latn|[[Revised Romanization of Korean|nun]]}} || || 'snow'|| See Korean phonology
|-
| rowspan="3" |Kurdish
|Kurmanji (Northern)
|
| rowspan="3" |
| rowspan="3" |'wood'
| rowspan="3" |See Kurdish phonology
|-
|Sorani (Central)
| rowspan="2" |/çû
|-
|Palewani (Southern)
|-
| Latin || Classical ||  ||  || 'pig' || 
|-
| colspan="2" | Limburgish ||  ||  || 'beautiful' || Back or near-back, depending on the dialect. The example word is from the Maastrichtian dialect.
|-
| colspan="2" | Lower Sorbian ||  ||  || 'tooth' ||
|-
| colspan="2" | Luxembourgish ||  ||  || 'air' || See Luxembourgish phonology
|-
| colspan="2" |Malay
|ubat|
|'medicine'
|See Malay phonology
|-
| colspan="2" |Malayalam
|
|
|'Salt'
|See Malayalam phonology
|-
| colspan="2" | Mongolian || /üür |||| 'nest'||
|-
| colspan="2" | Nogai ||  |||| 'water'||
|-
| colspan="2" |Persian
|دور/dur
|[duɾ]
|'far'
|See Persian phonology
|-
See Polish phonology
|-
| colspan="2" | Portuguese ||  ||  || 'you'|| See Portuguese phonology
|-
| colspan="2" | Romanian ||  ||  || 'one' || See Romanian phonology
|-
| colspan="2" | Russian || /uzkiy/uzkij || || 'narrow' || See Russian phonology
|-
| colspan="2" | Serbo-Croatian ||  /  ||  || 'rainbow' || See Serbo-Croatian phonology
|-
| colspan="2" | Shiwiar ||  || || ||
|-
| colspan="2" | Spanish ||  ||  || 'curable' || See Spanish phonology
|-
| colspan="2" | Sotho ||  ||  || 'fame' || Contrasts close, near-close and close-mid back rounded vowels. See Sotho phonology
|-
| colspan="2" |Swahili
|
|[ubongo]
|'brain'
|
|-
| colspan="2" |Tagalog
|
|[ˈʔutɐŋ]
|'debt'
|
|-
| Thai || Standard || ชลบุรี/chonburi || style="text-align:center;" | || 'Chonburi' || 
|-
| colspan="2" | Turkish ||  ||  || 'far' || See Turkish phonology
|-
| colspan="2" | Udmurt || /urėtė || || 'to divide' ||
|-
| colspan="2" | Ukrainian ||/rukh |||| 'motion'|| See Ukrainian phonology
|-
| colspan="2" | Upper Sorbian ||  ||  || 'beetle' || See Upper Sorbian phonology
|-
| colspan="2" | Urdu
|| /dur
|| 
|| 'far'
|| See Urdu phonology
|-
| colspan="2" |Welsh
|mwg
|[muːɡ]
|'smoke'
|See Welsh phonology
|-
| colspan="2" |West Frisian
|jûn
|[juːn]
|'evening, tonight'
|See West Frisian phonology
|-
| colspan="2" | Yoruba || itọju || [itɔju]
|  ||
|-
| Zapotec|| Tilquiapan || gdu' ||  || 'all' ||
|}

Close back compressed vowel

Some languages, such as Japanese and Swedish, have a close back vowel that has a distinct type of rounding, called compressed or exolabial. Only Shanghainese is known to contrast it with the more typical protruded (endolabial) close back vowel, but the height of both vowels varies from close to close-mid.

There is no dedicated diacritic for compression in the IPA. The spread-lip diacritic  may also be used with a rounded vowel letter  as an ad hoc'' symbol, but 'spread' technically means unrounded.

Features

Occurrence

See also
 Index of phonetics articles
 Close central compressed vowel
 Close front protruded vowel

Citations

References

External links
 

Close vowels
Back vowels
Rounded vowels